Lone Star Steakhouse & Saloon was an American casual dining restaurant chain with a single independently owned and operated franchise still in business in 2021 on the island of Guam. The chain served steak, seafood, salad, and similar food items. Lone Star opened its first restaurant in 1989 in Winston-Salem, North Carolina. In March 1992, Lone Star became a public company with eight restaurants opened. At its maximum, 267 Lone Star Steakhouses were in operation. The company filed for Chapter 7 bankruptcy on September 7, 2017.

By August 2019, the then operating company website advertised four locations, all of which are independently confirmed closed. On October 6, 2019, the second-to-last location in Knightdale, North Carolina officially closed, which was the last Lone Star location in the continental United States. The location reopened as a Saltgrass Steak House. Also , one remaining independently owned and operated location of this restaurant still exists in Tamuning, Guam.

History 
Lone Star was founded by Jamie B. Coulter, who started his restaurant career as a major franchisee of the Pizza Hut chain. Separately, a company called Creative Culinary Concepts opened a prototype Lone Star Steakhouse & Saloon restaurant in Winston-Salem, North Carolina in 1989. in 1991, Coulter signed an agreement with Creative Culinary Concepts to open 4 Lone Star restaurants, which would have a Texas Roadhouse-style ambiance. Coulter incorporated Lone Star Steakhouse & Saloon in January 1992, becoming the President, CEO, and Chairman of the chain.

The chain, at this point featuring eight restaurants, went public in March 1992 to raise the cash for expansion. The initial public offering raised $91 million. In 1993, 1994, and 1995, Lone Star was awarded the distinction of "best small business in the country" by Forbes magazine, and in 1994 ranked No. 6 in Fortune magazine's list of fastest-growing companies – a higher rank than any other restaurant. Coulter himself was named chief executive of the year in 1996 by Restaurants and Institutions.

By the end of 1995, there were 182 restaurants in operation, which expanded further to 205 locations by March 1997 and further yet to 265 by the end of that same year. However, Lone Star faced problems with market saturation, rising food and labor costs, declining same-store sales, and management turnover as the company entered the late 90s. The company's growth came to a sudden halt, with the chain reaching its maximum extent of 267 restaurants after opening just two in all of 1998, and ended the 1990s with 265 restaurants after closing two in 1999. During this time, the company's stock price plummeted from $46 in 1996 to just $6 by the end of 1998. As a result of this turmoil, a minor shareholder in Lone Star, Guy W. Adams, waged a successful battle to unseat Coulter as chairman of the Board of Directors of the company he had founded, though Coulter maintained his position of CEO. Lone Star had begun to seek a buyer to take the company private in 2002.

Private buyout 
On August 18, 2006, the 222-restaurant large Lone Star Steakhouse chain signed an agreement to be acquired by Lone Star Funds, an unaffiliated, Dallas-based private equity firm, for $27.10 per share in cash. This initial agreement was opposed by some major shareholders. On November 11, 2006, Lone Star Funds raised its offer to $27.35 per share. On December 12, 2006, shareholders voted to accept the offer.

Because it became private, Lone Star Steakhouse was de-listed from NASDAQ.  This is also the reason Lone Star stopped sponsoring the No. 40 Dodge of David Stremme. Following the buyout, new and remodeled Lone Star Steakhouse locations switched from the classic "Texas Roadhouse" theme to a more urban-style restaurant, abandoning most of the Texas and cowboy themes in its older restaurants. The newer restaurant design was more upscale, with virtually none of the Americana seen in the pre-2006 restaurants. This was largely due to the
changes made from two major shareholders that bought into the new ownership in March 2007, Jean Stupec and Kimberly Anderson. Significant changes were made and the talk of closing locations were soon underway. This was mostly due to the convincing shareholders meeting that either a number of locations close or they would lose a significant amount of money. This shareholders meeting was led by Jean Stupec, who was well known in the industry for possessing one of the best business minds in the restaurant field. It was also led by her now husband, Daniel Skinner. Daniel Skinner was also well known in his field as one of the top union laborers in Chicago area.

Under Lone Star Funds' ownership, and largely in response to the Great Recession, Lone Star significantly reduced its restaurant locations. This included closures in early 2014 that totaled 27 restaurants, bringing the chain down to 152 locations. The closures continued, including another large-scale restaurant closing in September 2015 that saw another 19 units close, bringing the chain down to 112 locations.

In December 2015, Lone Star Steakhouse and Texas Land & Cattle restaurant chains were acquired by the newly formed Day Star Restaurant Group, at which point there were 78 Lone Star Steakhouses in operation. Day Star co-founder Scott Smith left Day Star in March 2016 due to disagreements with his business partners, mainly Jean Stupec and Kimberly Anderson, over the direction of the company. After Smith's departure, restaurant closures accelerated, with the Lone Star brand declining from 64 locations at the end of December 2015 down to 16 locations in January 2017. Among these closures was the closure of the original Lone Star Steakhouse in Winston-Salem, North Carolina, which shut down in the summer of 2016.

After closing most of the remaining restaurants, Lone Star Steakhouse filed for Chapter 11 Bankruptcy Protection on February 13, 2017. The company claimed that the remaining restaurants were sold to a new owner on July 31, 2017, and for that reason explained that any gift cards would no longer be honored. The Chapter 11 restructuring was converted to a Chapter 7 bankruptcy filing on September 7, 2017.

, the company website listed 4 locations, all of which have since closed. The website lists locations in Mount Vernon, Illinois, which closed in March 2019; in Mount Pleasant, Michigan, which closed on October 5, 2018; in Asheville, North Carolina, which closed on July 2, 2018; and in Middletown, Ohio, which closed in September 2018. On October 6, 2019, an independently run location in Knightdale, North Carolina officially closed, which was the last Lone Star location in the continental United States.

Yelp indicates that one instance of this restaurant still exists by name in Tamuning, Guam. During the COVID-19 pandemic, the restaurant had offered take-out, delivery and dine-in options by June 2020. By January 2021, the restaurant expanded their service to include curb side pick up, indoor and outdoor dining with restrictions.

Associated restaurants

Sullivan's 
Sullivan's Steakhouse was conceived of by Lone Star founder Jamie Coulter in 1995, who sought to introduce a new restaurant brand that would cater to the lower end of the upscale steakhouse market, where checks would average $35 per patron. The restaurants, named after boxer John L. Sullivan, were inspired by 1940s’ interior decor that was designed with an 80% male clientele in mind. The first Sullivan's opened its doors in May 1996 in Austin, Texas.

Sullivan's hit an all-time high of 20 restaurants by 2011.

Sullivan's separated from Lone Star in 2012, when the Del Frisco's Restaurant Group, consisting of 32 restaurants under the Del Frisco's Double Eagle Steak House, Del Frisco's Grille, and Sullivan's Steakhouse banners, went public.

The original Sullivan's Steakhouse in Austin closed on January 9, 2018.

The Del Frisco's Restaurant Group sold its then-14 unit Sullivan's Steakhouse division to Romano's Macaroni Grill in September 2018 in order to pay off debts.

As of February 2023, there are 15 Sullivan's Steakhouses in operation.

Del Frisco's 
Del Frisco's was founded in 1981, and was bought out by Lone Star Steakhouse & Saloon shortly before the launch of the Sullivan's Steakhouse brand. Del Frisco's would serve as the most upscale of the Lone Star Steakhouse family of restaurants.

The Del Frisco's Restaurant Group, including restaurants under the Del Frisco's Double Eagle Steak House, Del Frisco's Grille, and Sullivan's Steakhouse banners, separated from Lone Star when it went public in 2012.

As of February 2021, there are a total of 16 Del Frisco's Double Eagle Steak House restaurants and 24 Del Frisco's Grille restaurants in operation.

Texas Land and Cattle 
As of 2002, Texas Land and Cattle steakhouses (stylized TXLC) were part of The Steak Company, a corporate umbrella that also owned the Lone Star, Sullivan's, and Del Frisco's brands.

Texas Land & Cattle was purchased along with Lone Star Steakhouse from Lone Star Funds by Day Star Restaurant Group in December 2013; at the time of the sale, there were 27 Texas Land & Cattle restaurants, most of which were in the state of Texas.

At the end of December 2015, 25 TXLC remained in operation, but this figure dropped to 15 units by January 2017. TXLC entered Chapter 11 bankruptcy protection along with Lone Star in February 2017. The company claimed that the remaining restaurants were sold to a new owner on July 31, 2017, and for that reason any gift cards were no longer being honored. The bankruptcy converted to Chapter 7 in September 2017, and the case continues to this day.

As of February 2021, the Texas Land & Cattle website lists 1 open location.

Lone Star Steakhouse & Saloon Australia 
Lone Star Steakhouse & Saloon first opened in Australia, at Parramatta in January 1993 after acquiring the naming rights from a Melbourne-based franchise of the same name.

Over the next seven and a half years, Lone Star expanded to 21 stores across Australia. However, following an August 2000 business review of its operations Lone Star shut down 10 stores across Australia.

On December 22, 2003, the American parent sold the 11 remaining Lone Star Restaurants operating in New South Wales, Victoria and Queensland to Robert LaPointe and Tim Smith.

In April 2010, Outback Jacks Bar & Grill purchased all five New South Wales-based restaurants, intending to rebrand them once franchisees were found.

On July 1, 2011, Lone Star Steakhouse announced that they would close all Queensland stores immediately.

In September 2017 the rebranded Lone Star Rib House opened a store in North Lakes shopping centre in Brisbane's north adding to its other stores in Mackay, Springfield and the Gold coast. Tossing your free peanut shells on the floor has also made a comeback.

In late 2011, Outback Steakhouse added the former Lone Star site of Penrith to its growing list of restaurants after extensive remodelling.

In October 2011, the original Parramatta store closed its doors.

References

External links 
 
 

1987 establishments in North Carolina
American companies established in 1987
Private equity portfolio companies
Restaurant chains in the United States
Restaurants established in 1987
Restaurants in North Carolina
Steakhouses in Australia
Steakhouses in the United States
Theme restaurants
Companies that filed for Chapter 11 bankruptcy in 2017
Companies that have filed for Chapter 7 bankruptcy